Going Home is the ninth novel in Canadian cartoonist Dave Sim's Cerebus comic book series. It is made up of issues #232–265 of Cerebus. It was collected as the 13th and 14th "phonebook" volumes, as Going Home (#232–250, March 2000) and Form & Void (#251–265, May 2001).

Cerebus has reunited with Jaka, and has agreed to travel with her to Sand Hills Creek, where he grew up. Along the way, they take a ride on a riverboat and meet F. Stop Kennedy, a caricature of F. Scott Fitzgerald; and later they meet Hamilton Earnestway (Ernest Hemingway) and his wife Mary.

Background
Cerebus has spent two novels confined to a tavern. At the end of the previous book, Cerebus meets his creator (Sim), who leaves him a packageJaka's doll, Missy. Jaka then appears, and the two are reunited and fall in love. Jaka's tries to convince Cerebus to go to Cerebus' childhood home, Sand Hills Creek, with her. He has to make a decision between his male friends in the tavern or Jaka. He eventually gives in to Jaka, and the two set off.

Synopsis

Going Home was divided into three sections. "Sudden Moves" and "Fall and the River" were collected in the Going Home "phonebook" collection, and "Form & Void" was collected as Form & Void.

Sudden Moves
(Cerebus #232–239)

Cerebus and Jaka are together and deeply in love. On their way to Cerebus' childhood home of Sand Hills Creek, they stop at taverns along the way. Jaka's aristocratic status has afforded them protectionCirinists (including a caricature of Janet Reno) move along to the taverns ahead of the couple to ensure that they have a wonderful time wherever they go. They go shopping for Jaka's outfits each morning and move on by afternoon, never spending more than a day at any location.

On their travels, the pair come across pubs run by caricatures of personalities in the comics world such as Greg Hyland, Rick Veitch and Alan Moore.

Jaka insists on shopping and seeing the important sites along the way, and Cerebus gets worried as Sand Hills Creek lies on the other side of the Conniptin mountainsthey could get caught in the first snowfall and get snowed in.

Fall and the River
(Cerebus #240–250)

Cerebus and Jaka take a riverboat ride, and onboard come across F. Stop Kennedy, a caricature of F. Scott Fitzgerald.

Form & Void
(Cerebus #251–265)

Cerebus and Jaka find a hunting lodge in which to spend the winter. They are surprised to find out that the famous writer Hamilton Earnestway (a parody of Ernest Hemingway) and his wife, Mary, are lodging there as well.

Cerebus, a fan of Earnestway's, is unabashedly starstruck. Earnestway, however, is in his twilight years, and stricken with depression and writer's block. Cerebus is initially oblivious to Ham's state, but can't help noticing how down and quiet he has become. He is dominated by his boisterous wife. Her speech balloons are dramatic, while his are shaky and small.

Publication

Going Home was published in Cerebus issues #232 (July 1998) to #265 (April 2001) and collected in two volumes: Going Home in March 2000, collecting Cerebus #232–250; and Form & Void in May 2001, collecting Cerebus #251–265. Going Home first printing in limited signed (by both Dave Sim and Gerhard) and numbered (out of 1000) March 2000, . Form & Void first printing in limited signed (by both Dave Sim and Gerhard) and numbered (out of 1000) May 2001, .

All the coversincluding those of the collectionswere done with full-colour photographs taken by Gerhard. When serialized, Sim included copious amounts of notes on the background research he did into F. Scott Fitzgerald which was included as "Chasing Scott" in the Going Home volume.

References

Notes

Sources
 Cerebus Fangirl
 Cerebus Wiki, set up by Cerebus Fangirl

Further reading
Going Home page at Cerebus Wiki

2000 graphic novels

Cerebus novels
Canadian graphic novels
Canadian comics